Cognac-la-Forêt is a commune in the Haute-Vienne department in the Nouvelle-Aquitaine region in western France.

See also
Communes of the Haute-Vienne department

References

Communes of Haute-Vienne